Millett may refer to:

People
 Adia Millett, American artist
 Anthea Millett (born 1941), British public servant
 Arthur Millett (1874–1952), American actor
 Charisse Millett (born 1964), American politician
 Frederick Millett (1928–1990), English cricketeer 
 John D. Millett (1912–1993), president of Miami University in Ohio
 Kate Millett (1934–2017), American feminist writer and activist
 Larry Millett (born 1947), American journalist and author
 Lewis L. Millett (1920–2009), US Army officer
 Martin Millett (born 1955), British archaeologist
 Michael Millett (1977–1995), English footballer
 Patricia Ann Millett (born 1963), U.S. Court of Appeals for the District of Columbia Circuit Judge
 Paul Millett (born 1954), British historian at Cambridge University
 Peter Millett, Baron Millett (1932–2021), British judge
 Peter Millett (diplomat) (born 1955), British ambassador to Libya
 Terron Millett (born 1968), American boxer

Places
 Millett, Michigan
 Millett, Nevada
 Millett Hall, Oxford, Ohio
 Millett Opera House, Austin, Texas

See also

 Millet (disambiguation)